Weinmannia loxensis is a species of plant in the family Cunoniaceae. It is endemic to Ecuador.  Its natural habitat is subtropical or tropical moist montane forests.

References

loxensis
Endemic flora of Ecuador
Vulnerable flora of South America
Taxonomy articles created by Polbot